Annu Kapoor (born Anil Kapoor; 20 February 1956) is an Indian actor, singer, director, radio disc jockey, and television presenter who has appeared in over a hundred films, as well as television series. His career has spanned over 40 years as an actor, producer, director and singer. Besides acting, he also does a Radio show, named Suhaana Safar With Annu Kapoor which airs on 92.7 big FM. He has won numerous awards in his career, including two National Film Awards, one Filmfare Awards and two Indian Television Academy Awards in varied categories.

Early life
Annu Kapoor was born in Itwara, Bhopal, Bhopal State, on 20 February 1956, to Madanlal, a Punjabi father with roots in Peshawar and Kamal, a Bengali Brahmin mother. His father owned a travelling Parsi theatre company which performed in cities and towns, and his mother was a Urdu teacher and a trained classical singer. His grandfather Kripa Ram Kapoor was a doctor in the British Army and his great grandfather Lala Ganga Ram Kapoor, a revolutionary who was executed during the Indian freedom struggle.

Due to poor financial circumstances, he had to quit school following secondary education. With a salary of ₹ 40, his mother worked as a teacher. On his father's insistence, he joined his theatre company. Following a stint there, he joined National School of Drama in 1976, after his brother Ranjit Kapoor, who was already a student there insisted. After graduating from the National School of Drama and a brief stint with its repertory company, in 1981, he played a 70-year-old man in the play Ek Ruka Hua Faisla in Bombay (now Mumbai). Film director Shyam Benegal who saw Kapoor perform, sent him a letter of appreciation and signed him for his 1983 film, Mandi.

Personal life 
Kapoor has promoted India's positive aspects in his programmes. Kapoor's sister Seema Kapoor, was married to actor Om Puri. His elder brother, Ranjit, is a director and screenwriter and his sister, Seema, is a producer and actor. Kapoor's younger brother, Nikhil, is a writer and lyricist.

Kapoor has four children (three sons— Kavan, Maahir and Evaan—and a daughter, Aradhita) from two marriages. His wife, Anupama, is American by birth. Annu remarried his first wife, Anupama (Pami), in 2008.

He changed his name from Anil Kapoor to Annu Kapoor to avoid confusion with the hero of the film Anil Kapoor, while acting in Tezaab.

Career

Acting

He made his screen debut with an uncredited role in Amitabh Bachchan starrer Kaala Patthar (1979). After then, he appeared in many films such as Aadharshila (1982), Betaab (1983), Mandi (1983) and Khandar (1984). He got his first breakthrough with Utsav (1984), in which he portrayed the role of Masseur. For which he got his first nomination in the Filmfare Awards in the category of Best Performance in a Comic Role. Subsequently he starred in many critically and commercially acclaimed films like Mr. India (1987), Tezaab (1988), Ram Lakhan (1990), Ghayal (1990), Hum (1991), Darr (1993), Sardar (1993), Om Jai Jagadish (2002), Aitraaz (2004) and 7 Khoon Maaf (2011).

Kapoor began his career as a stage actor in 1979 and was noticed in 1984's Ek Ruka Hua Faisla, directed by Basu Chatterjee and written by elder brother Ranjeet. Annu made his film debut in Mandi, (directed by Shyam Benegal) in 1983. His career has spanned over 30 years, including Bollywood cinema, television serials and game shows. Kapoor is best remembered for hosting the singing show Close-Up Antakshari, produced by Zee TV. His performance as an obsessive-compulsive sperm-bank physician in 2012's Vicky Donor met with critical and popular acclaim. He worked in the horror TV serial Kile ka Rahasya (1989) as a cop who was fond of singing.

Kapoor has also appeared in Yamla Pagla Deewana 2.
His second big breakthrough came with Vicky Donor (2012), he portrayed the role of Dr. Baldev Chadha. His performance was lauded by critics and audiences, for which he won a Filmfare Award, a IIFA Award, a National Film Award, a Screen Award all in the category of Best Supporting Actor. After Vicky Donor, he starred in Yamla Pagla Deewana 2 (2013), Shaukeen (2014), Saat Uchakkey (2016), Jolly LLB 2 (2017), Missing (2018), Dream Girl (2019), Khuda Haafiz (2020) and Suraj Pe Mangal Bhari (2020).

Television
In 2007, Antakshari – The National Challenge was relaunched on STAR One. The previous year, its "final" episode was telecast; the programme's initial run was from 1993 to 2006. His range of roles varies from portrayal as Saint Kabir in DD National TV serial of the same name, as Mahatma Gandhi in Sardar and Veer Savarkar in Kaala Pani, to police inspector in 7 Khoon Maaf, a petty thief in Utsav to comedic villain in Hum.

The Golden Era – With Annu Kapoor  on the Mastiii channel is a nostalgia TV show about Indian cinema, adorned with classical era's Hindi film songs and commentary by Annu Kapoor on unheard tales of Bollywood Cinema's Legends.

Despite films, Annu has been very active in television shows. He is also known for judging and hosting the 90's musical show Antakshari (1993-2005) and Golden Era with Annu Kapoor (2011). He has also appeared in some television series like Param Vir Chakra (1988), Ajnabi (1994), Kabeer (1995), Gubbare (1999) etc.

As a radio presenter
Currently, he does a radio programme on 92.7 Big FM called "Suhaana Safar with Annu Kapoor on 92.7 Big FM". It's a daily show that features nationally on the radio networks covering all Hindi speaking radio stations across the country. He recreates the magic of the Golden era with unforgettable melodies of that era and untold stories of the stars and films of the Hindi Cinema. The show comes with the tagline "Filmy Duniya Ki Kahi Ankahi Kahaniya".

Director
Kapoor has directed several plays. He also directed a feature film Abhay (The Fearless), starring Nana Patekar, Moon Sen and Benjamin Gilani) for the Children's Film Society, India. The film won the 1995 National Film Award for Best Children's Film.

Producer
Kapoor produced a musical talent contest for children (Aao Jhoomein Gaayen for SAB TV) and a Bengali-language musical talent-hunt show, Gaan Gaao Taaka Naao on Rupashi Bangla TV in Kolkata. He also produced a musical in Mathura entitled Ek Sunhari Shyam.

Filmography

Directed venture

Films

Television

Radio (RJ)

Theatre

Parsi theatre
 Laila Majnu
 Harischandra
 Shirin-Farhad
 Bhakta Prahlad
 Shree Krishna Avtar
 Dahi Wali
 Qatl-e-Tamizan

Modern plays 
 Antim Yatra: Directed by Barry John
 Three Sisters: Written by Anton Chekhov, directed by E. Alkazi
 The Great God Brown by Eugene O'Neill
 The Zoo Story by Edward Albee
 Ek Ruka Hua Faisla

Awards

Footnotes

References

External links

 
 
 

Indian male film actors
1956 births
Living people
Male actors from Mumbai
Male actors in Hindi cinema
Male actors from Bhopal
National School of Drama alumni
Punjabi people
Bengali people
20th-century Indian male actors
21st-century Indian male actors
Best Supporting Actor National Film Award winners
Directors who won the Best Children's Film National Film Award
Filmfare Awards winners
Screen Awards winners
International Indian Film Academy Awards winners
Indian game show hosts